The East of England Co-operative Society is the fourth largest consumer co-operative in the United Kingdom after The Co-operative Group, The Midcounties Co-operative and Central England Co-operative. It is a registered society with its headquarters in Wherstead, near Ipswich and trading in the eastern counties of Essex, Suffolk and Norfolk. The Society is the area's largest independent retailer.

History

The East of England Co-operative Society is an amalgamation of smaller societies from across East Anglia which have joined together over the years. Most recently, the Colchester and East Essex Co-operative Society merged with the Ipswich and Norwich Co-operative Society in 2005.

The consumer co-operative movement has its roots in the early part of the nineteenth century and the principles of self-help and social equity that developed during the Victorian era. The first successful retail co-operative was established in 1844 by the Rochdale Pioneers. The Ipswich and Norwich Society was the product of an amalgamation, in 1993, of the Ipswich Co-operative Society (known as the Ipswich Industrial Co-operative Society from 1868 to 1968 and incorporating, since 1991, the engagements of the former Stowmarket Society, established 1889) and the Norwich Co-operative Society (formed in 1858). The Colchester and East Essex Society was founded as Colchester Co-operative Society in 1861, expanding through merger with the following co-operative societies:

Activities

The East of England Co-op’s principal business activities are food retailing, funeral services and management of its investment property portfolio. They also have interests in petrol forecourts, travel, events and conferencing, security, and stonemasonry.

It previously ran a dairy with doorstep deliveries, but this was sold to Dairy Crest in early 2008 and their department stores and a jewellery store were sold to Vergo Retail in 2009. In 2010 their car dealerships were also sold to various owners. In early 2019 the Society sold its pharmacy and optical businesses.

The Society is a corporate member of the Co-operative Group, sourcing its food through the national buying programme, the Co-operative Federal Trading Services.

Membership
Customers and employees who join the co-op as members receive a dividend card, which when presented at transaction enables them to receive points. These points are then allocated a monetary value, decided by the board and based on the organisation's profits that year.

Membership is open to all customers, colleagues and communities in the East of England Co-op's trading area. Members receive a share in the profits and in 2021 more than £1.8 million was issued as dividends.

See also
British co-operative movement
Eastern Savings and Loans

References

External links
East of England Co-operative Society

Consumers' co-operatives of the United Kingdom
Colchester Co-op
Ipswich Co-op
Retail companies established in 2005
Defunct department stores of the United Kingdom
Co-operatives in England
2005 establishments in England
Companies based in Ipswich